Bel-Air is a 2019 short fan film written and directed by Morgan Cooper, based on the 1990s sitcom The Fresh Prince of Bel-Air. The film serves as a mock trailer for a darker, more dramatic re-imagining of the sitcom. It was uploaded on YouTube on March 10, 2019.

In August 2020, it was announced that it was being developed into a full television show, with Cooper and original series star Will Smith as executive producers. The series had reportedly been in the works for over a year since Cooper posted his Bel-Air trailer on YouTube, with Netflix, NBC's Peacock, and HBO Max all bidding for the series. On September 8, 2020, it was picked up by Peacock, which gave Bel-Air a two-season order.

Plot
After being involved in a gang fight during a street basketball game, Will Smith is sent by his mother out of the rough streets of Philadelphia to live with his uncle and aunt in the affluent neighborhood of Bel Air, Los Angeles, in the hopes of straightening out his life.

The film is supposed to take place in 2019. The trailer is heavily influenced by modern-day popular culture, according to Cooper in an interview.

Cast
 Jerry Madison as Will Smith (originally played by Will Smith)
 Sherri Roulette-Mosley as Vy Smith (originally played by Vernee Watson)
 Granvile O'Neal as Uncle Phil Banks (originally played by James Avery)
 Kira Ashby as Aunt Viv Banks (originally played by Janet Hubert-Whitten and Daphne Maxwell Reid)
 Jelani Talib as Carlton Banks (originally played by Alfonso Ribeiro)
 Rufus Burns as Jazz (originally played by Jeffrey Townes)
 Sada K. as Hilary Banks (originally played by Karyn Parsons)
 Khrystal Coppage as Ashley Banks (originally played by Tatyana M. Ali)
 Jada Paige as Lisa Fuller (based on the character Lisa Wilkes, originally played by Nia Long)

NOTE: The characters Geoffrey Butler and Nicky Banks (portrayed by Joseph Marcell and Ross Bagley in the original series) do not appear in the film.

Production
Morgan Cooper shot the Philadelphia sequences of Bel-Air in his hometown of Kansas City, Missouri, in a span of six months.

Reception and expansion
Will Smith, who played the main character of the original sitcom, heavily praised the fan film, commenting that "Morgan did a ridiculous trailer for Bel-Air. Brilliant idea, the dramatic version of The Fresh Prince for the next generation." He also hinted at options of expanding the idea beyond the short film.

On August 11, 2020, the series Bel-Air was officially announced after being in the works for over a year. At the time, Netflix, HBO Max, and Peacock were bidding for the rights to the show. On September 8, 2020, Peacock gave the series a two-season order under the title Bel-Air, with Westbrook Inc. and Universal Television producing. Smith and Cooper executive-produce, alongside Terence Carter, James Lassiter, Miguel Melendez, Malcolm Spellman, Quincy Jones, Benny Medina, Andy Borowitz, and Susan Borowitz. An online premiere for the series was held on February 9, 2022, by Crown & Conquer. The series premiered on Peacock on February 13, 2022.

References

External links
 
 

2019 films
2019 short films
2019 independent films
Fan films
Films set in Philadelphia
Films set in Los Angeles
Films shot in Missouri
The Fresh Prince of Bel-Air
2010s English-language films
Films released on YouTube